Pseudohostus is a monotypic genus of South Australian lynx spiders containing the single species, Pseudohostus squamosus. It was first described by William Joseph Rainbow in 1915, and is found only in South Australia.

See also
 List of Oxyopidae species

References

Monotypic Araneomorphae genera
Oxyopidae
Spiders of Australia
Taxa named by William Joseph Rainbow